This is a list of notable people, past and present, who were born in, residents of, or otherwise closely associated with Sarnia, Ontario, Canada.

A
Bill Abbott Jr., sailor
Cam Abbott, hockey player
Chris Abbott, hockey player
Joanne Abbott, sailor
Katie Abbott, sailor
Matt Abbott, sailor
Bob Ackles, football administrator
Stephen Andrews, visual artist
Doug Armstrong, ice hockey executive
Neil Armstrong, former NHL linesman and member of the Hockey Hall of Fame

B
Tim Bernhardt, hockey player
Jean-Robert Bernier, 38th Canadian Surgeon General, principal medical adviser to the North Atlantic Alliance
Mark Bice, curler
Steve Bice, curler
Paul Blundy, politician
Brad Boston, sailor
David Boushy, politician
John Bradley, physician
Mike Bradley, politician
Andy Brandt, former city alderman and mayor, former head of the Ontario Progressive Conservative Party, and former chairman and CEO of the LCBO
Michael A. Brown, former Ontario Speaker of the House
Nick Bucci, former professional baseball player in the Milwaukee Brewers Farm system
Shawn Burr, NHL hockey player who played 878 career games and finished with 181 goals and 440 points
Jerry Butler, hockey player

C
Leo Cahill, football administrator
William Campbell, politician
Mike Ceresia, racquetball player
David Chilton, author of The Wealthy Barber; panelist on Dragons' Den
Talia Chiarelli, gymnast
Dino Ciccarelli, former NHL hockey player who was inducted into the Hockey Hall of Fame in 2010
Susan Clark, actress
Dale Clarke, hockey player
Jim Clayton, musician
Voltairine de Cleyre, activist
Daryl Cloran, theatre director
Charlie Cotch, hockey player
Dave Cranmer, CFL player
Mike Crombeen, hockey player

D
Mike Dark, hockey player
Alex De Carolis, soccer player
Carrie Delahunt, curler
Caroline Di Cocco, politician
James Doohan, actor, "Scotty" on Star Trek; attended Sarnia Collegiate Institute & Technical School
Robyn Doolittle, journalist
Rick Dowswell, athlete
Derek Drouin, athlete

E
Marian Engel, author
Eric Ethridge, country pop singer, songwriter, chiropractor
Lance Evers, professional wrestler known as Lance Storm

F
Justin Fazio, hockey player
Ron Fogarty, hockey coach
Scott Foster, accountant and emergency NHL goaltender
Brian Francis, novelist
Jamie Fraser, hockey player
Kerry Fraser, NHL referee
Rick Fraser, hockey player

G
Cheryl Gallant, politician
Roger Gallaway, politician
Mike Gardiner, MLB player with the Seattle Mariners, Boston Red Sox, Montreal Expos, and the Detroit Tigers
Ted Garvin, NHL and AHL coach winner of the Turner Cup
Brian Groombridge, artist
Sara Gross, athlete
Emm Gryner, musician, actress
Don Gutteridge, writer

H
Lloyd Haddon, hockey player
Chris Hadfield, astronaut for whom Sarnia's airport is named; first Canadian to walk in space
Dave Hadfield, musician
Wilfred Smith Haney, politician
Kyp Harness, musician and writer
George "Duke" Harris, NHL player with the Minnesota North Stars and the Toronto Maple Leafs
Steve Hazlett, hockey player
Dave Hill, mountaineer, summitted Mount Everest May 20, 2011
Jordan Hill, hockey player
Matt Hill, professional golfer, 2009 Jack Nicklaus Award winner; the only golfer besides Tiger Woods to win the Conference, Regional and National Championship in same season; plays at North Carolina State University
Jamie Hislop, hockey player
Mike Hobin, hockey player
Doug Hocking, CFL player
Sean Hogan, singer/songwriter, performing recording artist, rock drummer, studied jazz at Humber and Music Industry Arts at Fanshawe College
Gary Holt, hockey player
John Hubbell, skater
Chuck Huizinga, hockey player
Jim Hunt, sports journalist

J
Lloyd Douglas Jackson, politician
Ken James, politician
Dustin Jeffrey, professional hockey player in the Pittsburgh Penguins organization
Thomas George Johnston, politician

K
Karen Kidd, aquatic ecotoxicologist
Shannon Kee, curler
Patrick Kerwin, Chief Justice of Canada
Sami Khan, filmmaker
Don Knowles, rugby player
Henry Kock, horticulturist

L
Mary Lawson, writer
William Leach, Canadian Armed Forces officer
Eugene Carlisle LeBel, academician
Dan Leckie, politician
Ryan LeDrew
Stephanie LeDrew
Hank Lehvonen
Michael Leighton, NHL goalie
Sunny Leone, Bollywood actress, adult entertainer
Richard Vryling Lesueur, politician

M
Kenneth Maaten, athlete
Roberta MacAdams, politician
Alexander Mackenzie, the second Prime Minister of Canada; namesake of one of Sarnia's high schools; buried in Sarnia's Lakeview Cemetery
Ellen MacKinnon, politician
Dave Madden, actor
Michael Marinaro, skater
Cameron Mathison, All My Children actor
Owen Maynard, engineer
John McCahill, hockey player
Scott McCord, actor
Heath McCormick, curler
Gary McCracken, musician
Pauline Mills McGibbon, 22nd Lieutenant Governor of Ontario
David McGillivray, skater
Ian McKegney, hockey player
Tony McKegney, NHL hockey player who scored 20 or more goals in eight seasons of his 900+ game career
Rick McNair, athlete and writer
Arnie McWatters, rugby player
Sid Meier, programmer and designer of several popular computer strategy games
Wayne Merrick, NHL hockey player who played 774 career games
Kim Mitchell, rock musician
Jeremy Molitor, boxer
Steve Molitor, boxer, two-time and current International Boxing Federation super bantamweight champion
Dominic Moore, hockey player
Robbie Moore, hockey player
Ian Murray, politician
Laurence B. Mussio, businessman

N
Harry Neale, CBC hockey commentator
Bob Neely, hockey player
Kraig Nienhuis, hockey player

O
George Olah, 1994 Nobel Laureate in Chemistry and researcher at Dow Chemical

P
Frederick Forsyth Pardee, politician
G. Scott Paterson, businessman
Nick Paithouski, rugby player
Rob Palmer, hockey player
Dominique Pegg, gymnast.
Norm Perry, football player
Jessica Platt, hockey player
Marie Prevost, actress

R
Kim Renders, theatre professional
Dean Robertson, golfer
Patricia Rozema, film director
Katherine Ryan, comedian

S
Marceil Saddy, politician
Lloyd St. Amand, politician
Dave Salmoni, zoologist, animal trainer, and television host on Animal Planet and The Discovery Channel
Boady Santavy, weightlifter
Dalas Santavy, weightlifter
Alfred H. Savage, horticulturalist, transit manager (Toronto Transit Commission, Chicago Transit Authority), municipal manager
Shelley Scarrow, television producer
R. Murray Schafer, composer
Matt Scurfield, musician
Kevin Sharp, soccer player
Jason Simon, hockey player
Rene Simpson, tennis player
David William Smith, politician
Mike Stapleton, former NHL player; son of Pat Stapleton
Pat Stapleton, former NHL player and current owner of the Strathroy Rockets junior "B" hockey team
Brad Staubitz, hockey player
Harry Steel, politician
Taylor Steele, skater
Hilary Stellingwerff, athlete
Mike Stevens, legendary harmonica virtuoso, regular on the Grand Ole Opry
Lance Storm, wrestler
Bruce Sweeney, film director

T
Dave Taylor, politician
Rob Thomson, MLB manager, Philadelphia Phillies
Wayne Tosh, CFL player
Keegan Connor Tracy, actress, born Tracy Armstrong

V
Pat Verbeek, NHL hockey player with the New Jersey Devils, Hartford Whalers, Dallas Stars and Detroit Red Wings; Stanley Cup winner with the Dallas Stars

W
Carol Wainio, artist
Angela Walker, tennis player
Don Ward, former NHL player with the Chicago Blackhawks and Boston Bruins
Joe Ward, hockey player
Jim Watson, current Mayor of Ottawa
Mike Weir, PGA Tour golfer, winner of the 2003 Masters
Paul Wells, journalist, editor, Toronto Star
John Wing, Jr., comedian and frequent The Tonight Show with Jay Leno guest
Donovan Woods, singer-songwriter
Steve Wormith, CFL player

Y
Paul Ysebaert, former NHL player

References

 
Sarnia
Sarnia